Parazen pacificus, the parazen, is a species of zeiform fish found in deep oceanic waters at depths of from .  This species grows to a length of  TL.  This species is the only known member of the genus Parazen.

References
 

Zeiformes
Fish described in 1935